Săveni is a small town located in Botoșani County in the Western Moldavia region in northeastern Romania. There is an archaeology museum located in the town.

Near Săveni at 47°56′2.27″N 26°50′19.58″E, there is a 210 metres tall guyed mast for FM-/TV-broadcasting. The town features two Orthodox churches, the "Saint Nicholas" church and the "Saint George" church.

The town administers five villages: Bodeasa, Bozieni, Chișcăreni, Petricani and Sat Nou.

The town's main educational centers are the "Școala Gimnazială Nr.1 Săveni" elementary and middle school, with an old decrepit building from the early 1900' which functioned as a jewish school, and the "Liceul Teoretic Dr. Mihai Ciucă", which is a elementary and high school.

The "Spitalul Orășenesc Săveni" is the local hospital. The old cinema "Patria" was recently rehabilitated with funds and has become a modern "Casă de Cultură".

Natives
Cristian Bădiliță
Dan Caspi
Mihai Ciucă
Sammy Lerner
Alexandru Țigănașu

References

External link

Towns in Romania
Populated places in Botoșani County
Localities in Western Moldavia
Monotowns in Romania